The Saharawi National Archive (in Spanish: Archivo Nacional Saharaui or Archivo Nacional del Pueblo Saharaui) is the national archive of the Saharawi people.

The national archive was started with materials from the Archivo de Ministerio de Información of Sahrawi Arab Democratic Republic and it reached 17,500 microfilms.

See also 
 List of national archives
 Sahrawi people
 Western Sahara

References

External links 
  - The archive details start in 4:45

Saharawi
Buildings and structures in the Sahrawi Arab Democratic Republic